Club de Golf Chapultepec is a golf club in Naucalpan, just outside Mexico City, Mexico. It has hosted the Mexican Open multiple times, and has hosted the WGC-Mexico Championship 4 times between 2017 and 2020.

Description
A tree-lined parkland course with tight fairways and undulating terrain, it is built approximately 1.36 miles (more than 7,800 feet) above sea level, which results in much longer ball flights.

History
In 1904 Scotsman and former U.S. Open winner Willie Smith moved to the Country Club of Mexico City to become a club professional. He was tasked with designing a new course, however he died before it could be completed. His brother and two-time U.S. Open winner, Alex Smith, completed the course in 1921. The course was renovated by Percy Clifford in 1972.

Scorecard

Source:

Difficulty 
Below shows how each hole played to par in editions of the WGC-Mexico Championship held at the course.

Source:

References

External links
Official website

Golf clubs and courses in Mexico
Sports venues in the State of Mexico
1921 establishments in Mexico